Kot Manan is a village in Sialkot District,  Gujranwala Division, Punjab Province, Pakistan. It is located south south-west of the city of Sialkot. Located at Kot Manan is a park or place of interest named  Gondal Poultry form.

References
Gondal Farm House

Villages in Sialkot District